Changzheng is a town in the west of Putuo District, Shanghai.

The governmental center is located at No. 180, Wanzhen Road.

Climate

References

Towns in Shanghai
Putuo District, Shanghai